European route E34 forms part of the United Nations International E-road network.  It connects Zeebrugge, the major seaport of Bruges, with Bad Oeynhausen, a German spa town located beside the River Weser at the eastern edge of North Rhine-Westphalia. At Bad Oeynhausen the E34 links to the E30, a major pan European east-west artery. It also passes, relatively briefly, through the Netherlands, following the southern by-pass of Eindhoven.   Within Germany the route follows from south-west to north-east the full length of North Rhine-Westphalia.

The three names of the road from the coast 
By the early 1990s the western portion of the route, between Antwerp and the coast, was a dual carriageway with frequent intersections, the more busy of which were controlled by traffic lights and marked by  speed limits.   Starting at the Antwerp end, this part of the E34 has more recently been progressively upgraded with junctions either eliminated or else replaced by motorway-style intersections. The road is still of sub-motorway quality between the coast and Zelzate, but to the east of the road tunnel under the Ghent–Terneuzen Canal, the upgrade is virtually complete. The upgrade from National road to Autoroute quality has been reflected in a name change, from N49 to A11: in terms of national road numbers, as long as the upgrade remains incomplete, the two names are currently used interchangeably or together (N49-A11) when referring to the full length between Antwerp and Zeebrugge. In Belgium the E route numbers are given prominence at least equal to nationally assigned road numbers, so that in practice the road may be marked, using all three names, as the N49-E34-A11. Locally the road is often referred to more simply as the expressway (de expresweg).

Congestion 
The route skirts Antwerp using the southern R1 inner ringroad which includes the Kennedy Tunnel: this is closed to vehicles with certain classes of dangerous loads.   These are required to divert onto the northern R2 outer ringroad.   To address the resulting delays, and because the inner southern ring route itself frequently becomes seriously congested, a northern inner ring road for Antwerp is being planned.

The German portion of the E34 passes across the northern side of Germany's Ruhr industrial belt.   Most of the road, which is currently being progressively upgraded, is now a six lane (three in each direction) highway.   Access points are relatively close together in this section and the route - especially the section between Duisburg and Dortmund - is prone to delays resulting from traffic congestion.

Route

External links 
 UN Economic Commission for Europe: Overall Map of E-road Network (2007)

34
E034
E034
E034